Radhika Piramal is the Vice Chairperson of VIP Industries since 2010. Previously, she has served as Executive Director and as Managing director of the company. She is a graduate from Oxford University has an MBA from Harvard Business School. She is one of the few openly homosexual Indian corporate leaders. Radhika was married in London to Amanda.

References 

Year of birth missing (living people)
Living people
21st-century Indian businesswomen
21st-century Indian businesspeople
Alumni of the University of Oxford
Harvard Business School alumni
Lesbian businesswomen
Indian lesbians
Indian LGBT businesspeople